The Douglas XTB2D Skypirate (also known as the Devastator II) was a torpedo bomber intended for service with the United States Navy's Midway- and Essex-class aircraft carriers; it was too large for earlier decks. Two prototypes were completed, but the dedicated torpedo bomber was becoming an outdated concept, and with the end of World War II, the type was deemed unnecessary and cancelled.

Design and development
In 1939, Douglas designers Ed Heinemann and Bob Donovan began work on a VTB Proposal to replace the TBD Devastator torpedo bomber. In 1942, the team led by Heinemann and Donovan began work on a new project named the "Devastator II". On 31 October 1943, just four days after the very large s were ordered into production, Douglas received a contract for two prototypes, designated TB2D, receiving the official name: "Skypirate".

The TB2D was powered by a Pratt & Whitney R-4360 Wasp Major driving contra-rotating propellers. Four torpedoes (such as the Mark 13 torpedo) or an equivalent bomb load could be carried on underwing pylons. Defensive armament consisted of two 20 mm (.79 in) cannon in the wings and .50 in (12.7 mm) machine guns mounted in a power-operated dorsal turret.

Very large for a single-engined aircraft, the TB2D would have been the largest carrierborne aircraft at the time; it could carry four times the weapon load of the Grumman TBF Avenger. With only limited support from the US Navy, and facing a recommendation for cancellation on 20 May 1944 due to the aircraft being designed only for the CVB and CV9 carriers, the TB2D project was in peril even at the design and mockup stage.

Operational history

The two "Skypirate" prototypes, BuNo 36933 and 36934, were ready for flight trials in 1945 with the first prototype XTB2D-1 flying on 13 March 1945. The second example had a 58 cm increase in the length of the fuselage, and flew later in summer 1945. Both prototypes were test flown without any armament. Despite the flying trials proceeding on schedule, the collapse of the Japanese forces in the Pacific along with delays in the Midway class, eliminated the need for the type and the 23 pre-production aircraft on order were subsequently cancelled. The flight trials were suspended and the two prototypes were eventually reduced to scrap in 1948.

Specifications (XTB2D-1 Skypirate)

See also

Citations

Bibliography
 Andrews, Harold: XTB2D-1. United States Naval Aviation News, January 1982, pp. 20–21 
 Francillon, René J. McDonnell Douglas Aircraft since 1920: Volume I. London: Putnam, 1979. .
 Kowalski, Bob. Douglas XTB2D-1 Skypirate (Naval Fighters, Volume Thirty-Six). Simi Valley, CA: Ginter Books, 1996. .
Wagner, Ray. American Combat Airplanes of the 20th Century: A Comprehensive Reference. Reno, Nevada: Jack Bacon & Co., 2004. 

TBD2 Skypirate
Douglas TBD2 Skypirate
Carrier-based aircraft
Aircraft with contra-rotating propellers
World War II torpedo bombers of the United States
Cancelled military aircraft projects of the United States
Single-engined tractor aircraft
Low-wing aircraft
Aircraft first flown in 1945